The Journal of East Asian Studies is a peer-reviewed academic journal published triannually by Lynne Rienner Publishers. It was established in 2001 and is abstracted and indexed by Academic Search Premier, EBSCOhost, International Bibliography of the Social Sciences, International Political Science Abstracts, and Social Sciences Citation Index.  the editor-in-chief is Stephan Haggard.

References

External links

 
 

East Asian studies journals
English-language journals
Publications established in 2001
Triannual journals
Cambridge University Press academic journals